Moscow police can mean either of the following:

 Moscow City Police - primary responsibilities in law enforcement and investigation in the City of Moscow. 
 Moscow Oblast Police- polices the Region of Moscow